Gary Byrne (born 19 July 1954) is an Australian former soccer player who played for Australia during the late 1970s and early 1980s.

Playing career
A significant member of Australia's 1978 and 1982 World Cup campaigns and a vital part of Marconi Stallions successful early NSL years, where he won a national championship medal in 1979.

Honours
Byrne was made a member of the Football Federation Australia Football Hall of Fame in 2009.

References

1954 births
Living people
Soccer players from Sydney
Australia international soccer players
National Soccer League (Australia) players
Marconi Stallions FC players
Association football midfielders
Australian soccer players